The 1967 Campeonato Nacional de Fútbol Profesional, was the 35th season of top-flight football in Chile. Universidad de Chile won their sixth title, also qualifying for the 1968 Copa Libertadores.

League table

Results

Topscorer

References

External links
ANFP 
RSSSF Chile 1967

Primera División de Chile seasons
Chile
Prim